Franko Bushati (born 5 July 1985) is an Albanian professional basketball player who currently plays for the Basket Torino club of the Italian Serie A2 Basket league. He signed with Basket Torino in January 2020.

References

External links
Profile at FIBA Europe website
Profile at  RealGM.com
Profile at Basketball-Reference.com
Profile at eurobasket.com

1985 births
Living people
Shooting guards
Basketball players from Tirana
Albanian men's basketball players
Albanian expatriate basketball people in Italy
Basket Torino players
Basket Brescia Leonessa players